Ranucci is an Italian surname that may refer to:
Christian Ranucci (1954–1976), French criminal
Renato Rascel (born Renato Ranucci; 1912–1991), Italian actor and singer
Sante Ranucci (born 1933), Italian cyclist
Sigfrido Ranucci (born 1961), Italian journalist
Stefano Ranucci (born 1963), Italian politician

Italian-language surnames